This article covers the 2012 AFL season results for the Brisbane Lions.

Results

Regular season

Home and Away Season

Round 1

Round 2

Round 3

Round 4

Round 5

Round 6

Round 7

Round 8

Round 9

Round 10

Round 11

Bye

Round 12

Round 13

Round 14

Round 15

Round 16

Round 17

Round 18

Round 19

Round 20

Round 21

Round 22

Round 23

All times are local.

External links
Official Website of the Brisbane Lions Football Club
Official Website of the Australian Football League

References

Brisbane Lions
2012
Brisbane Lions